No Sleep is the second studio album by American progressive metalcore band Volumes, released on July 15, 2014. It is the last album to feature founding member and co-vocalist Michael Barr until his return in 2020, and it is the last to be released under the label Mediaskare Records. The album is a departure from the sound of their previous album, Via, as many of the songs are shorter in length, and contain more clean singing compared to those from the first album.

A lyric video was released for "The Mixture" and the full album was streamed by Mediaskare Records via YouTube.

Along with their 2011 release Via, the album was re-released in 2016 independently under the 91367 Records moniker, remastered and with a new cover. The remastered version omits the outro from the third track, "Erased", for unknown reasons.

Track listing

Personnel
Volumes
 Michael Barr – lead vocals
 Gus Farias – unclean vocals
 Diego Farias – guitars, programming, production, mixing, engineering 
 Raad Soudani – bass
 Nick Ursich – drums

Additional musicians
 Casey Sabol – additional vocals on track 5, "Across the Bed"

Additional personnel
 Brandon Paddock – production, programming, mixing, engineering
 Wes Hauch – guitar tracking production 
 Baron Bodnar – executive production
 Zack Ohren – mastering

Charts

References

External links

No Sleep Sampler at YouTube (licensed)

2014 albums
Volumes (band) albums
Mediaskare Records albums